Exum Glacier is a small glacier flowing north between Hughes Point and Bonnabeau Dome, in the Jones Mountains of Antarctica. It was mapped by the University of Minnesota – Jones Mountains Party, 1960–61, and was named by the party for Glenn Exum, a mountaineer who provided training in rock and ice climbing for the University of Minnesota field parties of 1960–61 and 1961–62.

See also
 List of glaciers in the Antarctic
 Glaciology

References 

 

Glaciers of Ellsworth Land